KPLR-TV (channel 11) is a television station in St. Louis, Missouri, United States, airing programming from The CW. It is owned and operated by network majority owner Nexstar Media Group alongside Fox affiliate KTVI (channel 2). Both stations share studios on Ball Drive in Maryland Heights, while KPLR's transmitter is located in Sappington, Missouri.

History

As an independent station

The station first signed on the air on April 28, 1959, as the first independent station in Missouri. The station's call letters were derived from the name of its founding owner, St. Louis real estate developer and hotelier Harold Koplar. Despite losing in his quest to build the station from the ground up, events effectively outside his control would allow him to acquire the license for the station in 1958.

CBS was originally granted a construction permit by the Federal Communications Commission (FCC) to build channel 11 in January 1957, prevailing over three other locally based competitors. But eight months later, CBS decided instead to purchase its existing St. Louis affiliate, KWK-TV (channel 4). As a condition of the channel 4 purchase, the FCC required CBS to relinquish the channel 11 license and construction permit. CBS did so by transferring it to the Koplar group, known as "220 Television, Incorporated", for no financial consideration. Almost immediately, the three-way deal was held up after the St. Louis Amusement Company, one of the original applicants for channel 11, protested to the United States Court of Appeals in January 1958. The U.S. Supreme Court ultimately upheld the decision in November 1958, but CBS had already consummated its deal for channel 4 several months earlier, changing the station's call letters to KMOX-TV – which were intended for channel 11 – and operated it for 28 years (it is now Gray Television-owned KMOV). Meanwhile, Koplar went to work building channel 11 on his own, no longer in the face of opposition.

KPLR originally operated from studios within the Koplar-owned Chase Park Plaza Hotel, located on Maryland Plaza in St. Louis' Central West End district. Channel 11 would move into a separate facility adjacent to the hotel several years later. Starting in the mid-1960s, Harold's son Edward J. "Ted" Koplar began working behind the scenes at KPLR, producing sports programming and developing the station's first regular local newscast. Ted Koplar became president and chief executive officer of channel 11 in 1979, and gained complete control of the station upon his father's death in 1985.

For most of its existence, KPLR was a traditional independent station featuring cartoons, sitcoms, movies, drama series and locally produced newscasts. The station was also available on many cable systems in Missouri, Illinois and Arkansas as a regional superstation until the late 1980s. Locally, channel 11's first and only competitor came in June 1969, when Evans Broadcasting launched KDNL-TV (channel 30). The Fox affiliation for the market went to KDNL when that network launched on October 9, 1986. While this was part of a larger affiliation deal with KDNL's then-owner, Cox Broadcasting, most of the markets in KPLR's cable footprint had enough stations by this point to provide a local Fox affiliate. This would have made the prospect of KPLR as a multi-state Fox affiliate unattractive to the Koplars in any event. 

On January 17, 1994, the station began airing the Action Pack syndication block; the block's inaugural broadcast, the made-for-TV movie TekWar, earned locally an 11.2 rating/16 share, a 129% increase over that same time period during November 1993.

In the summer of 1994, the station was approached by ABC to negotiate an affiliation agreement with the network to replace KTVI (channel 2) – which had been affiliated with ABC since it signed on as Belleville, Illinois-licensed WTVI on August 10, 1953 (when the station, then broadcasting on UHF channel 54, also maintained a primary CBS affiliation) – as its St. Louis affiliate. KTVI was among the thirteen "Big Three" network-affiliated television stations already owned or in the process of being acquired by New World Communications (and one of three out of the four stations that the group was acquiring from Argyle Television Holdings at the time) that were slated to switch to Fox under a long-term affiliation agreement announced between New World and then-Fox network parent News Corporation on May 23, 1994. Channel 11 station management would later turn the offer down; ABC instead reached an agreement with River City Broadcasting in August 1994 to shift the affiliation to outgoing Fox affiliate KDNL, which swapped network affiliations with KTVI on August 7, 1995.

WB affiliation
Upon that network's launch, on January 11, 1995, KPLR-TV became a charter affiliate of The WB (a venture between Time Warner and Chicago-based Tribune Broadcasting), marking the first time it maintained an affiliation with a broadcast television network. Koplar had reached a deal to affiliate with The WB in November 1993, more than a year before the network's launch. The WB offered prime time programs only on Wednesday evenings during its first half-season of operation, but would gradually evolve into offering a six-night-a-week schedule by September 1999; as such, for its first few years as a WB affiliate, KPLR continued to fill the 7:00 to 9:00 p.m. time slot with feature films and some first-run syndicated programs on nights when the network did not offer programming. During this period, alongside WB prime time programming and eventually animated series from the Kids' WB children's program block, KPLR carried recent and some older off-network sitcoms and drama series, movies on weekends as well as in prime time on weekdays, some first-run syndicated shows, and a blend of animated and live-action children's shows (including shows acquired via the syndication market as well as The Disney Afternoon block). For many years, even after joining The WB, KPLR was branded on-air as "St. Louis 11", often using a logo with the "O" in "St. Louis" converted into its "circle 11" numeric logo. At one point, KPLR almost picked up Fox Kids since KTVI (which was a part of an affiliation agreement between Fox and New World Communications) declined to carry it, but Fox Kids was turned down by channel 11 station management (including its owner at that time Koplar Communications) because the owner felt that "they had a strong slate of children's programming and no room for the Rangers", and KNLC (channel 24), a religious independent station in the St. Louis market had to pick the affiliation up. Ultimately, by the spring of 1996, due to objections to program content and accompanying national advertising, New Life Evangelistic Center/KNLC owner Rev. Larry Rice began refusing to sell local advertising during the Fox Kids weekday and Saturday blocks ceding local advertising slots to air public service messages from Rice's ministry that discussed various controversial moral issues (such as the death penalty, same-sex marriage and abortion), and reached an agreement with KTVI to carry Fox Kids starting in September 1996, making it the only New World-owned Fox station to carry the block.

On September 26, 1997, Koplar Communications announced it would sell KPLR to ACME Communications (owned by Jamie Kellner, who then also served as the chief executive officer of The WB) for $146 million. Five days later, on October 1, ACME assumed operational responsibilities for the station under a local marketing agreement with Koplar. The sale was finalized on March 1, 1998, ending 38 years of local, family ownership and earning a handsome return on their original investment. It would be ACME's only station on the VHF band during the analog era, as all of the other stations they owned were on UHF. As part of the sale agreement, Ted Koplar signed a three-year contract to remain with KPLR-TV as the station's CEO, along with serving as a consultant to ACME, for an annual salary of $1 million. However, Koplar resigned from KPLR/ACME in October 1999 after one year, citing an irreconcilable rift with ACME management.

In September 1998, KPLR changed its branding to "WB11". In 2000, KPLR began carrying UPN programming in off-hours, running select prime time shows and cartoons from the network's children's program block, Disney's One Too. UPN programs had previously run on KDNL during overnight and weekend timeslots and then on KNLC (channel 24, which subjected the network to several program preemptions due to content objections by owner, Larry Rice).  St. Louis was one of the few top-50 markets without a UPN affiliate. The station continued carrying UPN in off-hours until July 2002, leaving UPN with no St. Louis affiliate until WRBU (channel 46) carried a secondary affiliation in September of that year; WRBU then became a primary UPN affiliate on April 1, 2003.

On December 30, 2002, Tribune Broadcasting announced it would purchase KPLR-TV and its Portland, Oregon sister station KWBP from ACME Communications for $275 million; the sale was finalized on March 21, 2003. Also in 2003, KPLR moved its studios from the Chase Park Plaza (which by that time, went from a gutted complex where the station had been the only major tenant into a boutique hotel) to a new purpose-built studio facility in Maryland Heights.

CW affiliation

On January 24, 2006, UPN parent company CBS Corporation (which split from Viacom in December 2005) and WB network parent Time Warner (through its Warner Bros. Entertainment division) announced that they would dissolve the two networks to create The CW, a joint network venture that initially featured a mix of original first-run series and programs that originated on The WB and UPN. The network signed a ten-year affiliation agreement with Tribune Broadcasting for 16 of the 19 WB affiliates that the company owned at the time, including KPLR.

Nearly one month after the CW launch announcement, on February 22, 2006, News Corporation subsidiaries Fox Television Stations and Twentieth Television announced the launch of MyNetworkTV, a network created primarily to serve as a network programming option for UPN and WB stations that were left out of The CW's affiliation deals. Three weeks later, on March 9, WRBU was confirmed to be the St. Louis market's MyNetworkTV affiliate. KPLR-TV remained a WB affiliate until the network ceased operations on September 17, 2006; when the station affiliated with The CW upon that network's debut on September 18, KPLR began branding as "CW 11". (WRBU joined MyNetworkTV upon that network's launch on September 5.)

On September 17, 2008, Tribune announced that it would enter KPLR into a local marketing agreement with Fox affiliate KTVI effective October 1, as a result of the formation of a "broadcast management company" that was created to provide management services to stations owned by both Tribune Broadcasting and KTVI owner Local TV. Although KTVI was the senior partner in the deal, it vacated its longtime studios in the Clayton-Tamm/Dogtown neighborhood on St. Louis' west side and moved its operations to KPLR's Maryland Heights facility. The LMA resulted in both stations combining their news departments and sharing certain syndicated programs. On November 1, 2008, the station changed its on-air branding from "CW11" to "KPLR 11" as several Tribune-owned CW affiliates began shifting away from using references to the network within their station branding, and reincorporated the Gateway Arch into its logo (essentially, a revision of the logo that KPLR used following the Tribune purchase as a WB affiliate).

Tribune bought KTVI outright on July 1, 2013, as part of its $2.75 billion acquisition of Local TV; the sale received FCC approval on December 20, and was completed on December 27, creating the first legal station duopoly in the St. Louis market between KTVI and KPLR. Tribune's direct purchase of KTVI to form a duopoly with KPLR was possible as, in recent years, KPLR and KDNL have rotated between fourth and fifth place in total day viewership due to the weaker viewership of KDNL's programming since its news department was shut down by Sinclair in 2001 (KPLR ranked in fifth place in total day ratings at the time of the purchase, with KDNL ranking in fourth place).

There have long been rumors that ABC has considered moving its affiliation to KPLR, in part because KDNL-TV has been one of the network's weakest affiliates since joining the network in 1995 (in stark contrast to KTVI's former status as one of ABC's strongest affiliates). However, on March 26, 2010, KDNL owner Sinclair Broadcast Group extended its affiliation agreement with ABC to retain the network's affiliation on KDNL and the eight other ABC affiliates that Sinclair owned at the time for five years through August 2015.

On May 8, 2017, Sinclair—which has owned KDNL-TV since 1996, when it acquired that station's previous corporate parent, River City Broadcasting—entered into an agreement to acquire Tribune Media for $3.9 billion, plus the assumption of $2.7 billion in debt held by Tribune, pending regulatory approval by the FCC and the U.S. Department of Justice's Antitrust Division. The market conditions that allowed for Tribune to form a duopoly between KTVI and KPLR in 2013, ironically, precluded Sinclair from acquiring KPLR directly as, at the time of the merger announcement, channel 11 ranked in fourth place and KDNL ranked fifth among the St. Louis market's television stations in total day viewership. As the FCC prohibits common ownership of two of the four highest-rated television stations in a single market, Sinclair was required to sell KPLR to a third-party group in order to comply with those rules and alleviate potential antitrust issues preceding approval of the acquisition (Sinclair CEO Christopher Ripley cited St. Louis as one of three markets, out of fourteen where ownership conflicts existed between the two groups, where the proposed acquisition would likely result in divestitures).

Sinclair originally planned to retain operational stewardship of KPLR-TV through a local marketing agreement (possibly involving one of its partner companies); however, in an amendment to the Sinclair-Tribune merger submitted on February 21, 2018, the group announced that it would keep KDNL, purchase KTVI's license and assets, and sell KPLR-TV to an independent third party. On April 24, 2018, Des Moines, Iowa-based Meredith Corporation announced that it would purchase KPLR-TV for $65 million; the deal would have created a new duopoly between KPLR-TV and KMOV, the latter of which Meredith has owned since February 2014. The sale was canceled on May 15, amid objections by the Justice Department, likely due to similar viewership and advertising market conditions that led the agency to reject the Gannett Company's 2013 proposal to operate KMOV under an LMA with KSDK (now owned by Gannett broadcasting spinoff Tegna) and sell the former's license to Tucker Operating Company LLC; in a revised filing, Sinclair said it would instead put KPLR into a divestiture trust administered by Rafamedia LLC, led by media broker Richard A. Foreman, for sale to an independent third party that does not already own a television station in St. Louis. However, such a sale has so far been hampered because the owner would operate KPLR as a standalone CW affiliate (the majority of The CW's affiliates operate as part of duopolies with "Big Four" network affiliates as those stations tend to fall outside the "top-four" ratings threshold) and potential local programming issues related to its news operations being integrated with those of KTVI.

Three weeks after the FCC's July 18 vote to have the deal reviewed by an administrative law judge amid "serious concerns" about Sinclair's forthrightness in its applications to sell certain conflict properties, on August 9, 2018, Tribune announced it would terminate the Sinclair deal, intending to seek other M&A opportunities. Tribune also filed a breach of contract lawsuit in the Delaware Chancery Court, alleging that Sinclair engaged in protracted negotiations with the FCC and the U.S. Department of Justice's Antitrust Division over regulatory issues, refused to sell stations in markets where it already had properties, and proposed divestitures to parties with ties to Sinclair executive chair David D. Smith that were rejected or highly subject to rejection to maintain control over stations it was required to sell.

On December 3, 2018, Irving, Texas-based Nexstar Media Group announced it would acquire the assets of Tribune Media for $6.4 billion in cash and debt. The deal—which would make Nexstar the largest television station operator by total number of stations upon its expected closure late in the third quarter of 2019—would put KTVI and KPLR-TV under common ownership with Nexstar's existing properties in Champaign–Springfield–Decatur (CBS affiliate WCIA and MyNetworkTV affiliate WCIX), Peoria–Bloomington (CBS affiliate WMBD-TV and Fox-affiliated LMA partner WYZZ-TV), Rockford (Fox affiliate WQRF-TV and ABC-affiliated JSA/SSA partner WTVO) as well as its properties in Southwestern Missouri (NBC affiliate KSNF and ABC-affiliated JSA/SSA partner KODE-TV in Joplin and Fox affiliate KRBK, MyNetworkTV affiliate KOZL-TV and CBS-affiliated SSA partner KOLR in Springfield). The acquisition by Nexstar also effectively reunited KPLR-TV (along with KRCW-TV) with four stations that had previously been sister stations under ACME Communications ownership prior to 2002 turned CW affiliates: KUCW (formerly KUWB) in Salt Lake City, Utah, the duopoly of KWBQ and KASY-TV (the latter a MyNetworkTV affiliate) in Albuquerque, New Mexico (both are owned by Mission Broadcasting, but have an LMA with Nexstar), and WBDT in Dayton, Ohio (owned by Vaughan Media, but also has an LMA with Nexstar).

Programming
Syndicated programming on KPLR as of September 2022 includes Sherri, The Jennifer Hudson Show, The Kelly Clarkson Show, Karamo, The Steve Wilkos Show, Young Sheldon and The Big Bang Theory. KPLR also airs Fox programs that are preempted for other broadcasts by KTVI, such as local newscasts. For example, a 2021 college football matchup between Illinois and Nebraska was moved to KPLR due to KTVI's obligation to air Green Bay Packers preseason games.

Sports programming
KPLR-TV served as the home broadcaster of MLB's St. Louis Cardinals (for two stints from 1959 to 1962 and 1988 to 2006), the NBA's St. Louis Hawks (1959–1968) and the NHL's St. Louis Blues (for three stints from 1967 to 1976, 1982–83 and 1986 to April 21, 2009, the last Blues telecast on KPLR being a Stanley Cup playoff loss to the Vancouver Canucks). Both the Cardinals and Blues are now exclusive to Bally Sports Midwest, which formerly (as FSN Midwest) produced the games for the station throughout the late 90s and early 2000s. The production of the games before that time was from Bud Sports Productions, a division of Anheuser-Busch. During its WB years, KPLR-TV also syndicated its coverage of the Cardinals games to other stations in Arkansas, Iowa, Indiana, Kentucky, Missouri, Oklahoma, and Tennessee.

On May 23, 1959, the station debuted Wrestling at the Chase, a professional wrestling program that was originally produced from Chase Park Plaza's Khorassan Ballroom (until 1970). The show featured the most famous wrestlers in the National Wrestling Alliance, which was controlled in part by St. Louis promoter Sam Muchnick. Participants included Ric Flair, Harley Race, former NFL player Dick the Bruiser and Ted DiBiase, and is considered one of the wrestling industry's most historic programs. About 1,100 episodes were produced during the show's run, which ended on September 10, 1983, when Muchnick retired from promoting and handed the slot over to the World Wrestling Federation. Even after WWF took over the programming, they still taped matches at the KPLR studios and aired a variant of its syndicated programming under the Wrestling at the Chase banner, mostly offered to Midwestern stations who had previously aired Muchnick shows. Arguably KPLR's most notable wrestling moment came after it ceased airing locally produced content: on December 27, 1983, a Wrestling at the Chase taping contained the WWF debut of Hulk Hogan, who would become an international superstar with the promotion. KPLR produced a retrospective of the program in 1999, consisting mostly of latter-era footage plus interview clips of Muchnick's wrestlers and other employees, as well as others associated with the St. Louis sports scene such as Bob Costas and Joe Garagiola, the latter the program's first host. Included were clips from the program's only known surviving early episode, from 1962, which Garagiola recorded as an audition tape before leaving the program and kept throughout the years.

From April 9, 2006, to September 7, 2008, KPLR produced The Fan Show, a live sports talk program that was hosted by sports director Rich Gould, featuring audience-participation games and discussion. It was originally broadcast from The Casino Queen's Club Sevens for the first 20 months of its run, before the program relocated to AJ's Bar and Grill in December 2007.

Children's programming
From 1959 to 1968, KPLR aired the after-school children's program Captain 11's Showboat, which introduced The Three Stooges to St. Louis area television viewers. Captain 11 was played by longtime radio personality Harry Fender. Ted Koplar also diversified his family's entertainment holdings during his time at the helm of KPLR. This was most notably achieved through World Events Productions, which distributed three animated series Voltron: Defender of the Universe, Saber Rider and the Star Sheriffs, and Denver, the Last Dinosaur.

News operation

KTVI/KPLR presently broadcasts a combined 80 hours of locally produced newscasts each week; including a public affairs program on Saturday evenings called The Pulse of St. Louis, which airs over the final 45 minutes of the 7 p.m. newscast, and a weekly sports highlight program on Sunday evenings called Sunday Sports Extra, which also airs during that newscast.

Channel 11 has aired local news programs since its sign-on, and was one of the first independent stations in the country to have a functioning news department. Like most stations that are not affiliated with one of the Big Three networks, KPLR had traditionally aired a prime time newscast at 9 p.m. that ran one hour ahead of the late newscasts seen on the major network affiliates; for much of the time prior to 2008, KPLR's 9 p.m. newscast ran as a half-hour program. After KTVI moved its late evening newscast to 9 p.m. following its August 1995 switch from ABC to Fox, that station's prime time newscast consistently beat KPLR's in the ratings.

In the past, KPLR has attempted to format its newscasts to attract a younger audience, employing anchors under the age of 35 and featuring a more fast-paced reporting style. Nevertheless, KPLR has often been acknowledged by St. Louis Post-Dispatch television critics as a station strong on "sweeps stories", running one or more major investigative pieces during the November, February and May sweeps periods. KPLR's stories have also been seen as much more broad-based and less sensationalistic compared to other stations.

After entering into the local marketing agreement with KTVI, major changes were made to KPLR's news programming. First on September 8, 2008, KPLR shifted the flagship 9 p.m. newscast to 7 p.m. and expanded the program to one hour, trading timeslots with The CW's prime time schedule, which the station moved to 8–10 p.m. (instead of the network-recommended 7–9 p.m. Central Time slot) with the network's permission; this effectively resulted in the newscast being reduced to airing only on Monday through Friday evenings in part due to The CW airing a three-hour prime time lineup on Sundays at the time (although The CW turned its Sunday prime time slots over to the network's affiliates in September 2009, the 7 p.m. newscast would not expand to weekends until September 2012). The station cited an underserved younger audience in the 9 p.m. timeslot with the Big Three stations airing network programming meant for older viewers and competition from KTVI's 9 p.m. newscast as reasons behind the move.

In December 2008, KPLR moved production of its news programs to a temporary set in KTVI's Hampton studios as the Maryland Heights facility was being remodeled to accommodate both KPLR and KTVI's newscasts. On February 16, 2009, KPLR became the fourth St. Louis television station to begin broadcasting its local newscasts in high definition (one day after KTVI converted its newscasts to HD), broadcasting from a newly remodeled studio (which contained pieces from the KTVI's former "Studio B" set, along with a modernized news desk and a state-of-the-art weather center) that is located adjacent to the main news set now occupied by KTVI. Since KPLR and KTVI's news departments merged, there has been considerable sharing between the two stations in regards to news coverage, video footage and the use of reporters, although both outlets maintain their own primary on-air personalities (such as news and sports anchors) that only appear on one station. On April 6, 2009, KPLR debuted an hour-long midday newscast at noon on weekdays. This was followed on September 20, 2010, with the debut of an hour-long afternoon newscast at 4 p.m. On December 23, 2011, KPLR/KTVI opened a news bureau in the newly renovated Peabody Opera House in downtown St. Louis, to better serve the downtown and eastern portion of the St. Louis metropolitan area.

On January 28, 2015, KTVI/KPLR introduced a new combined set with LED lighting, two video walls, and a new anchor desk. Both stations now share the set but KPLR has a separate weather center. They also introduced new graphics and music package for both stations the same day.

Notable former on-air staff
 Julie Piekarski – entertainment reporter (1986–1988)
 Charles Jaco – political and war correspondent

Technical information

Subchannels
The station's ATSC 1.0 channels are carried on the multiplexed digital signals of other St. Louis television stations:

On May 31, 2006, KPLR added The Tube Music Network to digital subchannel 11.2; The Tube later abruptly suspended its operations on October 1, 2007. In 2010, the 11.2 subchannel became an affiliate of This TV.  On January 1, 2016, the 11.3 subchannel became a Comet affiliate.

Analog-to-digital conversion
KPLR-TV shut down its analog signal, over VHF channel 11, on June 12, 2009, the official date in which full-power television stations in the United States transitioned from analog to digital broadcasts under federal mandate. The station's digital signal continued to broadcast on its pre-transition UHF channel 26. Through the use of PSIP, digital television receivers display the station's virtual channel as its former VHF analog channel 11.

ATSC 3.0

References

External links
KPLR-TV Collection Finding Aid at the St. Louis Public Library

ATSC 3.0 television stations
The CW affiliates
Court TV affiliates
Comet (TV network) affiliates
Rewind TV affiliates
Nexstar Media Group
1959 establishments in Missouri
Television channels and stations established in 1959
PLR-TV
National Hockey League over-the-air television broadcasters